This is a list of player movements for Super Rugby teams prior to the end of the 2019 Super Rugby season. Departure and arrivals of all players that were included in a Super Rugby squad for 2018 or 2019 are listed here, regardless of when it occurred. Future-dated transfers are only included if confirmed by the player or his agent, his former team or his new team.

Blues

Chiefs

Crusaders

Highlanders

Hurricanes

See also

 List of 2018–19 Premiership Rugby transfers
 List of 2018–19 Pro14 transfers
 List of 2018–19 Top 14 transfers
 List of 2018–19 RFU Championship transfers
 SANZAAR
 Super Rugby franchise areas

References

2018
2018 Super Rugby season
2019 Super Rugby season